In voting systems, the Landau set (or uncovered set, or Fishburn set) is the set of candidates  such that for every other candidate , there is some candidate  (possibly the same as  or ) such that  is not preferred to  and  is not preferred to .  In notation,  is in the Landau set if 

The Landau set is a nonempty subset of the Smith set.  It was discovered by Nicholas Miller.

References
Nicholas R. Miller, "Graph-theoretical approaches to the theory of voting", American Journal of Political Science, Vol. 21 (1977), pp. 769–803. . .
Nicholas R. Miller, "A new solution set for tournaments and majority voting: further graph-theoretic approaches to majority voting", American Journal of Political Science, Vol. 24 (1980), pp. 68–96. . .
Norman J. Schofield, "Social Choice and Democracy", Springer-Verlag: Berlin, 1985.
Philip D. Straffin, "Spatial models of power and voting outcomes", in Applications of Combinatorics and Graph Theory to the Biological and Social Sciences, Springer: New York-Berlin, 1989, pp. 315–335.
Elizabeth Maggie Penn, "Alternate definitions of the uncovered set and their implications", 2004.
Nicholas R. Miller, "In search of the uncovered set", Political Analysis, 15:1 (2007), pp. 21–45. . .
William T. Bianco, Ivan Jeliazkov, and Itai Sened, "The uncovered set and the limits of legislative action", Political Analysis, Vol. 12, No. 3 (2004), pp. 256–276. . .

Voting theory